Events from the year 1710 in Sweden

Incumbents
 Monarch – Charles XII

Events

 February - Battle of Helsingborg
 

 
 

 - Arvid Horn appointed Privy Council Chancellery.
 - Vyborg is taken by the Russians. 
 July - The Great Northern War plague outbreak reach Stockholm.
 15 July – 10 October - Capitulation of Estonia and Livonia
 August–September - The Great Northern War plague outbreak spread from the capital to the Swedish country. 
 - Riga is taken by the Russians.
 24 September - Battle of Køge Bay (1710)  
 - Reval is taken by the Russians.
 - Scania is taken by the Danes.  
 - Royal Society of Sciences in Uppsala
 - Lars Gathenhielm is given royal permission to act as a privateer in the Baltic Sea.

Births

 
 
 
 
 
 

 Ulrica Catharina Stromberg, courtier (died 1777)

Deaths

 
 
 
 3 November - Maria de Croll, concert vocalist (born unknown date)
 Anna Maria Thelott, artist (born 1683)
 Dorothea Hoffman, hat maker
 Helena Lindelia, artist

References

External links

 
Years of the 18th century in Sweden
Sweden